Special Unit of NEDSA, also known as Sepah Navy Special Force (S.N.S.F.), is a Takavar unit in the Islamic Revolutionary Guard Corps (IRGC) Navy stationed in the Greater Farur Island of Persian Gulf.

Mission set 
The unit has marines, frogmen and snipers specializing in heliborne, amphibious warfare and naval boarding.

SNSF personnel train in combat diving, direct action, counterterrorism, special reconnaissance, underwater demolitions, amphibious assault, hostage rescue, and maritime visit, board, search, and seizure (VBSS) operations. Among the unit’s missions is to protect Iranian commercial vessels, and SNSF personnel have deployed to the Gulf of Aden to assist with Iranian counterpiracy operations.

Operations in Gulf of Aden 
In 2012, the unit performed a 117-days operation in Gulf of Aden to fight piracy off the coast of Somalia. The unit has collaborated with the American forces in the operation, for instance an American Sikorsky UH-60 Black Hawk did reconnaissance for the unit's boat.

Weapons
The Iranian produced Tondar SMG (Heckler & Koch MP5) 9mm is known to be used by the unit. The Spanish produced Star Model Z84 sub-machine gun is also favored by the unit. The Iranian produced AKM 7.62x39mm is also used by the unit in some situations.
AK-103 is used by this force.

Gallery

References 

Special forces of Iran
Islamic Revolutionary Guard Corps
Naval special forces units and formations